31 Vulpeculae is a binary star system in the northern constellation of Vulpecula. It is visible to the naked eye as a faint, yellow-hued point of light with an apparent visual magnitude of 4.56. The system is located approximately 228 light years away from the Sun based on parallax, and it is drifting further away with a radial velocity of +2.25 km/s.

The variable radial velocity of this system was first suspected by German Astronomer Friedrich Küstner in 1914. This value provides a lower bound on the actual semimajor axis for the orbit.

Having exhausted the supply of hydrogen at its core, it has expanded to eight times the Sun's radius. It is a red clump giant, which indicates it is on the horizontal branch and is generating energy through helium fusion at its core. This is a suspected variable star with a magnitude that varies from 3.77 to 4.08 in the I passband. It is about 700 million years old with 2.4 times the mass of the Sun.

References

External links
 

G-type giants
Horizontal-branch stars
White dwarfs
Spectroscopic binaries

Vulpecula
Durchmusterung objects
Vulpeculae, 31
198809
103004
7995